Pokémon the Movie 2000 is a 1999 Japanese animated fantasy adventure film directed by Kunihiko Yuyama. It is the second theatrical release in the Pokémon franchise.

The film has two parts: a 20-minute preceding short and the feature presentation. The events of the film take place during the second season of Pokémon: Adventures in the Orange Islands, where Ash, Misty and Tracey enter Shamouti Island. While there, they discover the three legendary bird Pokémon, Articuno, Zapdos, and Moltres. Meanwhile, a collector named Lawrence III attempts to steal the three Pokémon to awaken Lugia, which proves dangerous for the legendary Pokémon, Lugia, and Ash himself.

Pokémon the Movie 2000 was released in Japanese theaters on July 17, 1999, by Toho. The English-language adaptation was released in the United States on July 21, 2000, by Warner Bros. The film earned less at the box office than its predecessor, Pokémon: The First Movie, but was still a financial success and received better (albeit still negative) reviews upon release.

Plot

Pikachu's Rescue Adventure 
As in Pikachu's Vacation, all of the faces of the main human characters are unseen. When Togepi wakes up to see a group of Ledyba flying by it yawns and falls back down a hill and falls down a dark hole, Pikachu, Bulbasaur, Squirtle, Marill, Venonat, and Psyduck give chase and find themselves in a giant tree that once was Pikachu's old home. With help from Pikachu's new friend, Elekid, the Pokémon find Togepi but he has been mistaken for an Exeggcute egg. The Pokémon head off into the depths of the tree to find the missing egg, meeting a trio of dancing Bellossom along the way. A severe storm hits the area and Pikachu and his friends try to protect the Exeggcute eggs from being blown away. The grass Pokémon lend a hand and Snorlax saves everyone with his great strength. The storm fades when a Dragonair appears and calms the storm while a Chansey appears, revealing she had the missing egg all along. The eggs are reunited. Exeggcute suddenly evolves into Exeggutor with the assistance of a Leaf Stone. Pikachu and his friends say farewell to Elekid and the others and head back to their trainers. Meanwhile, Meowth tries to find his way to a campsite but ends up getting caught on Pikachu's mishaps and gives up.

The Power of One 
Lawrence III, a Pokémon collector, strives to make a legendary prophecy occur. His plan to capture the legendary birds Articuno, Zapdos, and Moltres will ultimately lead to the capture of the "Beast of the Sea" Lugia. Lawrence sets out in his flying hovercraft to the heart of the Orange Islands to capture the three legendary birds, referred to as the Titans of Fire, Ice and Lightning. He successfully captures Moltres, but this upsets the balance of power the birds have over the world's climate. Weather across the world begins to go haywire, alerting countless Pokémon to the change. Ash Ketchum and his companions Misty and Tracey Sketchit get caught in a freak storm, and are washed ashore on Shamouti, set in the centre of the Orange Islands. Learning that the island festival celebrating the legend is about to begin, Ash is selected as the festival's Chosen One by a girl named Melody, the festival maiden.

At the festival's banquet, Melody explains to Ash he must retrieve three crystal balls from each of the legendary birds' islands and take them to Shamouti's shrine, guarded by a talking Slowking, where Melody will end his task by playing the festival's song, actually the song of Lugia. Ash immediately sets out, led by the troubled Pikachu. Taken to Fire Island by sea captain Maren, Ash and Pikachu find Moltres' treasure, but are interrupted by Team Rocket. Misty, Tracey and Melody arrive via Melody's multi-purpose boat, followed by Zapdos who has come to claim the island. Pikachu and Zapdos communicate with each other with electric shocks, with Meowth serving as the translator. Lawrence appears overhead, attacking and capturing Zapdos as well as Ash and co. accidentally. Meanwhile, Professor Oak, Professor Ivy, and Ash's mother Delia Ketchum fly to the islands but their helicopter crashes on Shamouti. Having no use for them, Lawrence frees Ash and the others and attempts to capture Articuno, accidentally awakening Lugia in the process. Trying to foil Lawrence's plans, Ash and the others free Moltres and Zapdos who escape and bring down Lawrence's hovercraft.

Articuno, Zapdos, and Moltres engage in all out war, trying to destroy each other. Ash and co. manage to escape, gaining Zapdos' treasure in the process, and are transported back to Shamouti by a mysterious water spout revealed to be Lugia. Lugia at first tries to stop the battle, but is outmatched by the birds' powers combined against it. Telepathically it then explains the birds and the weather can be stopped by the legend's Chosen One, actually Ash in reality. Ash puts the two treasures he has on the shrine, but he is still missing the third one. Ash agrees to go to Articuno's island to get the final treasure, but his progress is halted by the legendary birds. Team Rocket arrive on a speedboat made from a dingy and the helicopter's discarded propeller, wishing to save the world in order to continue their villainy. The group race up to Articuno's shrine and retrieve the treasure, but before they can escape, the legendary birds appear. They destroy the speedboat before Articuno is knocked out by Moltres and Zapdos. Lugia rescues Ash, Pikachu and Team Rocket, but Team Rocket heroically jump into the sea upon realizing they are slowing Lugia down. Lawrence tries to catch Lugia, but Lugia uses its Aeroblast attack to destroy his airship and take out Moltres and Zapdos before collapsing into the sea.

Misty and Tracey rescue Ash and Pikachu, who venture to Shamouti Island's shrine and place the final treasure with the others. Melody plays Lugia's song, ending the storms and bringing peace to the legendary birds. Lugia rises from the sea, bringing the true Beast of the Sea with him, an underwater current that has been altering the climate. Later, after the birds returned to their islands, Lugia departs after thanking Ash. Delia and the professors arrive.  Delia, having witnessed her son's actions, asks him to be more careful which he complies with. Lawrence laments his decisions, deciding to start his collection again. Team Rocket reach the island a day later and are told by Slowking that the audience saw their heroics; the trio contemplates changing their ways but ultimately decide to stay the same when they realize their boss might not like the idea.

Cast

Release

Theatrical release 
The Power of One was released in Japan on July 17, 1999. An English-language adaptation of the film produced by 4Kids Entertainment and licensed by Warner Bros. under the Kids' WB label was released on July 21, 2000 in the United States.

Home media 
Pokémon The Movie 2000 was released on VHS and DVD on November 14, 2000.

Viz Media and Warner Bros announced that a limited edition Blu-ray Steelbook containing the first three Pokémon films will be released on February 9, 2016, along with single releases on DVD (These are: Pokémon: The First Movie, Pokémon The Movie 2000 and Pokémon 3: The Movie). In accommodation with the 20th anniversary of the Pokémon franchise, a digitally remastered version of the film was released on iTunes, Amazon and Google Play on February 27, 2016. Blu-ray Release on December 13, 2021 in the UK.

Reception

Box office 
The film was financially successful. It earned $9,250,000 on opening day, which was only less than $1 million behind the opening day of its predecessor. It reached third place for its opening weekend, grossing $19,575,608. On its second weekend it declined 68.3% to $6.2 million and descended to sixth place. It made $43,758,684 at the domestic box office, barely over half of the first film's domestic total.

As of 2015, the film is the 88th highest-grossing film in Japan, with ¥6.4 billion. The film made $133,949,270 at the end of its box office run.

Critical reception 
On Rotten Tomatoes, the North American adaptation of the film has an approval rating of 19% based on 69 reviews, with the website's critical consensus reading: "Despite being somewhat more exciting than the previous film, this kiddy flick still lacks any real adventure or excitement. What it does contain is choppy animation and poor voice acting. Doesn't match up to virtually anything out there." On Metacritic the film has a weighted average score of 28 out of 100, based on 20 critics, indicating "generally unfavorable reviews". Audiences polled by CinemaScore gave the film an average grade of "A−" on an A+ to F scale.

Plugged In said that "the plot is as tiresome as it was in the first movie. But the violence is tamed somewhat, so the positive messages shine a bit more brightly".

A more positive review was given by Gene Seymour of the Los Angeles Times. Seymour believed that the film "charms without talking down to its audience". He also compared it favorably to the first movie, stating, "...unlike its predecessor, 'Pokémon 2000' doesn't assume that everyone who sees it will know how to tell Togepi from Bulbasaur or Squirtle from Pikachu. Sure, I know now, but I'm not telling because I don't have to".

At the 2000 Stinkers Bad Movie Awards, the film was nominated for "Worst Achievement in Animation" and "The Remake or Sequel Nobody Was Clamoring For". However, it lost "Worst Achievement in Animation" to Digimon: The Movie.

Soundtracks 

In Japan, J-pop artist Namie Amuro sang the ending song "toi et moi". A soundtrack containing Shinji Miyazaki's original score for the film was released on September 9, 1999 along with two original songs sung by Rika Matsumoto and Akiko Hiramatsu.

Pokémon the Movie 2000 Soundtrack

The North American soundtrack was released alongside the film in 2000 by WB's then-sister company Atlantic Records on compact disc and compact cassette and includes many songs by popular artists, many of which do not appear in the film. In the English dub, Donna Summer sings the closing song in the film, "The Power of One". The melody of has been noted as having a close resemblance to Rick Wakeman's theme for the film The Burning, with the two opening bars being identical. The song was released as a single and was remixed by Jonathan Peters and Tommy Musto. The song drew new attention in 2011 due to Republican candidate Herman Cain quoting the lyrics as part of his campaign for President of the United States.

"Weird Al" Yankovic provided an original song, "Polkamon", which is played during the ending credits. The last song played during the credits was "Flying Without Wings" by Westlife. Italian singer Laura Pausini sings the ballad "The Extra Mile", written, among others, by Australian singer Tina Arena. The B-52's also recorded the song "The Chosen One" for the movie.

In the United States, the soundtrack sold 150,000 copies .

Track listing

Chart performance

Pokémon the Movie 2000 Original Motion Picture Score 
Pokémon the Movie 2000 Original Motion Picture Score is the orchestral soundtrack to the movie. The CD was originally released in some European countries in 2000. In 2004, it became available for download worldwide on iTunes.

Track listing

See also 
 List of Pokémon films
 List of films based on video games

Notes

References

Bibliography

External links 

 
 
 

Movie 2000
Warner Bros. animated films
Warner Bros. films
1999 films
1990s Japanese-language films
1999 anime films
1999 science fiction films
Japanese science fiction action films
Japanese sequel films
Films directed by Kunihiko Yuyama
Science fantasy films
Toho animated films
Toho films
Films set on fictional islands
Japanese animated fantasy films
Japanese fantasy adventure films
Films scored by Shinji Miyazaki
OLM, Inc. animated films